Rana Ratan Singh was a hereditary land owner in Umerkot, belonging to Sodha sub clan of Rajputs. Rana killed the British appointed Governor of Umarkot Fort, Syed Mohammad Ali, in 1847, during a tax protest. He was soon after tried and convicted of committing murder and treason, and hanged in Umarkot Fort, by the British.

References

Thari people
People executed by British India by hanging
People from Umerkot District